Hooper Cummings Van Vorst (1817–1889) was a judge in the New York City court system. 

Van Vorst was born on December 3, 1817, in Schenectady, New York, to parents of Dutch extraction. He graduated from Union College in 1839.

In 1868, he was appointed to the New York Court of Common Pleas.

In 1871, he was appointed to a 14-year term as a judge on the Superior Court of the City of New York.

Van Vorst died in New York City on October 26, 1889.

External links 
 Speech. "General Grant, his services to the country and his qualifications for the Presidency of the United States". Given before the National Club of New York City, on Oct. 12, 1868.

References

 
19th-century American judges
1817 births
1889 deaths